Kilconry is a civil parish of County Clare, Ireland, located about   northwest of Limerick, west of Shannon on the estuary of the River Shannon. The main village in the area is Ballycalla/Ballcally and it contains the Shannon Golf Course and Shannon Airport.

Geography
The civil parish of Kilconry lies in the barony of Bunratty Lower. It is in the southern part of the county and is bordered by Kilmaleery to the north and Clonloghan to the east and the River Shannon to the south and west. It is divided into 9 townlands:  

Ballycally
Ballyhennessy 
Carrigerry 
Feenish 
Garrynamona
Inishmacnaghtan
Rineanna North
Rineanna South 
Stonehall

See also
List of townlands of County Clare

References

Civil parishes of County Clare